This is a list of Italian football transfers featuring at least one Serie A or Serie B club which were completed after the end of the 2011–12 season and before the end of the 2012 summer transfer window. The window formally opened on 2 July 2012 and closed on 31 August (2 months), but Lega Serie A and Lega Serie B accepted to document any transfer before that day, however those players would only able to play for his new club at the start of 2012–13 season. Free agent could join any club at any time however.

May 2012 – July 2012

Note:
1 The deals would be effective on 1 July 2012
2 The deals would be effective on 27 June 2012

August 2012

Footnotes

References
general
 
 
 https://web.archive.org/web/20120907054121/http://www.lega-pro.com/sito/images/stories/comunicaz/Trasf_MI_31-8-2012.pdf
 
specific

Transfers
Italian
2012